Partula hyalina is a species of air-breathing tropical land snail, a terrestrial pulmonate gastropod mollusk in the family Partulidae. This species is endemic to French Polynesia.

References

External links
 

Fauna of French Polynesia
Partula (gastropod)
Gastropods described in 1832
Taxa named by William Broderip
Taxonomy articles created by Polbot